Global Precipitation Measurement (GPM) is a joint mission between JAXA and NASA as well as other international space agencies to make frequent (every 2–3 hours) observations of Earth's precipitation. It is part of NASA's Earth Systematic Missions program and works with a satellite constellation to provide full global coverage. The project provides global precipitation maps to assist researchers in improving the forecasting of extreme events, studying global climate, and adding to current capabilities for using such satellite data to benefit society. GPM builds on the notable successes of the Tropical Rainfall Measuring Mission (TRMM), which was also a joint NASA-JAXA activity.

The project is managed by NASA's Goddard Space Flight Center, and consists of a GPM Core Observatory satellite assisted by a constellation of spacecraft from other agencies and missions. The Core Observatory satellite measures the two and three dimensional structure of Earth's precipitation patterns and provides a new calibration standard for the rest of the satellite constellation. The GPM Core Observatory was assembled and tested at Goddard Space Flight Center, and launched from Tanegashima Space Center, Japan, on a Mitsubishi Heavy Industries H-IIA rocket. The launch occurred on February 28, 2014, at 3:37am JST on the first attempt. Agencies in the United States, Japan, India and France (together with Eumetsat) operate the remaining satellites in the constellation for agency-specific goals, but also cooperatively provide data for GPM.


Science objectives
GPM has five broad science objectives:
 advance precipitation measurement from space
 improve knowledge of precipitation systems, water-cycle variability and freshwater availability
 improve climate modeling and prediction
 improve weather forecasting and climate reanalysis
 improve hydrological modeling and prediction

Main instruments

Dual-Frequency Precipitation Radar (DPR)
The DPR is a spaceborne radar, providing three-dimensional maps of storm structure across its swath, including the intensity of rainfall and snowfall at the surface. The DPR has two frequencies, allowing researchers to estimate the sizes of precipitation particles and detect a wider range of precipitation rates. The Ku-band radar, similar to the PR on TRMM, covers a 245 km (152 mile) swath. Nested inside that, the Ka-band radar covers a 120 km (74.5 mile) swath. Data from the DPR is sent to the ground via a single-access link with TDRSS relay satellites.

GPM Microwave Imager (GMI)
The GMI is a passive sensor that observes the microwave energy emitted by the Earth and atmosphere at 13 different frequency/polarization channels. These data allow quantitative maps of precipitation across a swath that is 885 km (550 miles) wide. This instrument continues the legacy of TRMM microwave observations, while adding four additional channels, better resolution, and more reliable calibration. Data from the GMI is continuously sent to the ground via a multiple-access link with TDRSS relay satellites.

Precipitation data sets
GPM produces and distributes a wide variety of precipitation data products. Processing takes place at the Precipitation Processing System (PPS) at NASA Goddard Space Flight Center, as well as at the JAXA facility in Japan. Data is provided at multiple "levels" of processing, from raw satellite measurements to best-estimate global precipitation maps using combinations of all the constellation observations and other meteorological data. All data from the mission is made freely available to the public on NASA websites. Precipitation data is made available in a variety of formats, spatial and temporal resolutions, and processing levels which are accessible on the Precipitation Measurement Missions "Data Access" webpage. Several data visualization and analysis tools have been made available to provide easy access for the science and applications communities, which include the in-browser Earth science data analysis tool Giovanni, a web API, and a 3D near-realtime global precipitation viewer.

Social media and outreach 

In addition to maintaining social media accounts and the GPM Road to Launch Blog, JAXA and NASA developed several outreach activities specific to this mission prior to launch that the public could participate in. After launch a series of featured articles and videos were produced to highlight various scientific goals and discoveries of the mission, and an "Extreme Weather" blog is maintained to provide timely updates about the latest extreme precipitation events and natural disasters occurring around the world. A Precipitation Education website is also maintained to provide teachers and students with lesson plans, animations, and other resources to teach about the water cycle, Earth science, and the GPM mission. 
NASA Socials 
JAXA-NASA DC Cherry Blossom Event 
April 12, 2013, at NASA's Goddard Space Flight Center in Greenbelt, Maryland
GPM Media Day
Friday, Nov. 15, 2013, at NASA's Goddard Space Flight Center in Greenbelt, MD
Social media users were invited to apply for credentials to attend the media day activities and share their experiences via their own accounts.
 Photo Contests
Extreme Weather
Let it Snow
Unique Perspectives 
GPM Anime Challenge

In popular culture
The main character Mohan Bharghav (Shahrukh Khan) in 2004 Indian film Swades: We, the People is a Project Manager in NASA's GPM project. Movie starts from NASA's GPM project analysis. Bharghav discuss the importance of GPM and its positive impact on Earth. In the movie the GPM satellite is launched by the Space Shuttle.

A short anime film of 6 minutes, Dual frequency Precipitation Radar Special Movie, was produced by JAXA and White Fox in 2013.

References

External links 

  (NASA)
 GPM videos
  (JAXA)
 Global Precipitation Measurement/ Dual-frequency Precipitation Radar pamphlet
 GPM videos
 Twitter and Facebook

NASA programs
Precipitation
Spacecraft launched in 2014
Spacecraft launched by H-II rockets
JAXA
Satellites of Japan
Articles containing video clips
Earth observation satellites of the United States
Weather satellites
Satellite constellations